William J. Anderson wrote a narrative describing his life as a slave.

Early life
Anderson is believed to have been born on or around June 2, 1811, to Susan and Lewis Anderson. William's mother was a free woman, but his father was a slave, belonging to a Mr. Shelton. Later in William's life he wrote a narrative about himself that was published by the Chicago Daily Tribune and entitled:

Life and Narrative of William J. Anderson, Twenty-four Years a Slave; Sold Eight Times! In Jail Sixty Times!! Whipped Three Hundred Times!!! or The Dark Deeds of American Slavery Revealed. Containing Scriptural Views of the Origin of the Black and of the White Man. Also, a Simple and Easy Plan to Abolish Slavery in the United States. Together with an Account of the Services of Colored Men in the Revolutionary War--Day and Date, and Interesting Facts.

After the death of his father, his mother Susan sold William to Mr. Vance, who lived about ten miles away from her. William's life with Mr. Vance was not a good one. William was very interested in learning how to read and write and would often secretly steal or borrow books from white boys to practice these skills. Whenever his master discovered what William had been up to, he would whip and kick him. Nevertheless, William remained devoted to learning.

Religious beliefs
William was a devout Christian. He believed that if he was a good Christian, he would go to heaven. He thought that this was important because he had never been treated well on earth, and it would be one place he could be happy and rest. Finally after much practice and determination, William learned how to read. The next thing that he wanted to do was learn how to write. Late at night, when his master was asleep, he would practice his writing by candlelight. He soon took to teaching a short lesson on Sundays to some of the other slaves on the plantation. But soon the white people found out and banned them from meeting again to talk about learning. Anderson was a slave.

New master
William's next master kidnapped him in the night time and handcuffed him to bring him to his plantation. Anderson was not allowed to get any of his belongings or to say anything to friends or family. In Anderson's narrative he describes this master as "one of those cunning, fox-like slaveholders." Next he was brought to a slave market and sold to a southern trader. The trader then on November 6, 1826, tied together sixty to seventy slaves, Anderson included, and made them walk from Eastern to Western Tennessee. The journey took a total of two months. While William and the other slaves walked they sang "Farewell, ye children of the Lord". When they reached their final destination, women and men were separated to stand in lines to be sold.

Charged with crime
On December 12, 1856, William was arrested and charged with helping slaves from Kentucky. On pages 53 and 54 of his narrative he explains how horribly he was treated by the guards. He also explains what it was like to be an African American during those times in jail charged with such a crime. When the day of the trial came, several people testified against him but nevertheless, the court found him a free man. In the Appendix of his narrative it has a plan that he has written for a plan to abolish slavery:

References

External links
 Life and Narrative of William J. Anderson, Twenty-four Years a Slave. Chicago: Daily Tribune Book and Job Printing Office, 1857.

1811 births
Year of death missing
African-American writers
African-American slave records
19th-century American writers
People who wrote slave narratives
19th-century American slaves